The Municipality of Rhineland is a rural municipality (RM) in the Canadian province of Manitoba.  The RM had a population of 5,945 as of the 2016 Canada Census. The average age in the municipality is 31.

History

The municipality was incorporated on January 1, 2015, via the amalgamation of the Rural Municipality of Rhineland and the towns of Gretna and Plum Coulee. It was formed as a requirement of The Municipal Amalgamations Act, which required municipalities with a population less than 1,000 to amalgamate with one or more neighbouring municipalities by 2015. The Government of Manitoba initiated the amalgamations for municipalities to meet the 1997 minimum population requirement of 1,000 to incorporate a municipality.

Communities 
 Gretna
 Neubergthal
 Plum Coulee
 Rosenfeld

Demographics 

See also
 Altona, Manitoba
 Neche–Gretna Border Crossing

References 

2015 establishments in Manitoba
Manitoba municipal amalgamations, 2015
Populated places established in 2015
Rural municipalities in Manitoba